E.C. Dahls Brewery  (E.C. Dahls Bryggeri) is a brewery  and soft drink factory based in Trondheim, Norway.

History

E.C. Dahls Brewery was founded in 1856 by Erich Christian Dahl (1814–1882), a local businessman and consul-general from Trondheim.  He was the son of Erich Dahl (1774-1821) Christine Lyche (1776-1861). His parents had been the owners of an import-export business and shipping company. In 1851,  Erich Christian Dahl had bought  the Sugarhouse (Sukkerhuset) in the Kalvskinnet   area of Trondheim, where there had been a sugar refinery since 1754. Sukkerhuset was rebuilt for brewing. The brewery stayed in the building until 1984.

The first bottle of Bayerøl, a Munich-style dunkel, was sold in 1857. In 1910, the plant began to produce soft drinks at the brewery as well. Bayerøl was the most important type of beer until the early 20th century when Dahls Pils, a pilsener took over as the most popular beer.

In 1966, it was merged with Trondheim Aktie Brewery  (Trondhjems Aktiebryggeri), which was founded in 1899 and Trondheim Brewery (Trondhjems Bryggeri) which dated to 1919.  E.C. Dahls Bryggeri is now owned by Ringnes, part of the Group Carlsberg AS.

E.C. Dahl's Foundation
E.C. Dahl's Foundation (E.C. Dahls Stiftelse i Trondheim) was opened in Trondheim during  1908 with funding from the estate of Erich Christian Dahl. The Foundation originally established a hospital for newborn children and infant care. The Foundation now provides support in relation to different types of disabilities. The Foundation's Art Nouveau building in the Kalvskinnet  area of Trondheim is now used by the Trøndelag Art Center (Trøndelag Kunstnersenter) .

See also
Beer in Norway

References

Further reading
Koren, C. E. C. Dahls Bryggeri (Trondheim. 1906)
Thanem, Rolf W. (editor) E. C. Dahls bryggeri A/S 125 år 1856–1981 (1981)
Hegard, Tonte  Sukkerhuset, i Fredede hus og anlegg 4 – Sør-Trøndelag (Universitetsforlaget. 1986)

External links
Official Website
 Erich Christian Dahl
	

Breweries in Norway
Food and drink companies established in 1856
Companies based in Trondheim